Pseudomasaris vespoides is a species of pollen wasp in the family Vespidae.

References

Further reading

External links

 

Vespidae
Insects described in 1863